Topalhəsənli or Topalgasanli or Topalgasanly or Topalkhasanly may refer to:
Topalhəsənli, Goygol, Azerbaijan
Topalhəsənli, Kurdamir, Azerbaijan